Bongaigaon College is a higher educational institution in Bongaigaon, Assam, India. It was founded in August 1964. A group of visionaries contemplated starting an institution of higher learning in the educationally backward area of Assam on 8 July 1964. Bongaigaon College is the translated version of a lofty ideal. It is affiliated to Gauhati University.
 
The college with a campus spanning , offers +2 (arts and commerce), undergraduate (B.A, B.Com., BBA and BMC) — both general and Major and postgraduate (English and Hindi) programmes apart from offering a vocational programme in Functional English at the undergraduate level. Recently the cabinet meeting from government of Assam approved this college to be converted to University.

History

It was established by the efforts of Sitanath Brahmachowdhury, ex-M.P. and ex-president of Assam Sahitya Sabah, the late Bhabeswar Chowdhury, and the late Damodar Mahanta. The college was accorded the status of deficit grants-in-aid in 1972 by the Government of Assam.

Before this, the college had run on a self-sustaining basis with many teachers preferring to embrace the nobility of the profession, turning their backs on lucrative opportunities elsewhere. In the formative stages the college offered pre-university (Arts) programme. A full-fledged pre-university Commerce course started in 1984.

The undergraduate arts classes got underway in the 1966-67 session and the programme got affiliation from Gauhati University in 1971. The Degree Commerce classes started in 1978.

Bowing to the public demand for postgraduate course in English, the college authority took steps to begin the two-year PG course in 1991. Immediately afterwards Gauhati University granted affiliation to the PG programme. Since 2002 the PG course in English is running on semester system.

Courses
The college has two programmes at UG level, i.e., B.A and B.Com. (three-year degree course) and one programme at PG level, i.e., M.A in English and Hindi. A vocational course in Functional English is also offered.

The college offers major programmes in 10 subjects at the BA level and two at the B.Com. level. Subjects offering major in BA are English, Assamese, Bengali, Hindi, Bodo, Economics, Political Science, History, Education and Philosophy. Apart from it the college have also introduced Sociology department. At the B.Com. level the major courses are offered in Management and Accountancy.

 Higher Secondary Programme
 Arts
 Commerce

 Bachelor Programme
 Bachelor of Arts (B.A)
 Bachelor of Commerce (B.Com.)
 Bachelor of Business Administration (BBA)
 Bachelor of Mass Communication and Journalism (BMC)

The college entered into new era of academic studies by introducing the bachelor's degree in Business Administration from 2008, affiliated to Gauhati University. Subsequent addition was in the form of introducing the bachelor's programme in Mass Communication and Journalism under the Career Oriented Programme of UGC in 2009 with formal permission and affiliation of Gauhati University. The year 2008 also became remarkable for the college when it signed the memorandum of understanding (MoU) with IGNOU and became the partner institute under convergence scheme. A series of programmes and courses of distance learning have been introduced under the scheme in this campus converging the conventional and distance modes of teaching-learning.

References

External links

Universities and colleges in Assam
Colleges affiliated to Gauhati University
Bongaigaon
Bongaigaon district
Education in Bongaigaon
Colleges in Bongaigaon
1964 establishments in Assam
Educational institutions established in 1964